Farm House or The Farm House may refer to:

in the United States (by state)
Farm House (Urbana, Illinois), listed on the National Register of Historic Places in Champaign County, Illinois
The Farm House (Knapp-Wilson House), a U.S. National Historic Landmark on Iowa State University's campus
The Farm House (Bar Harbor, Maine), a summer estate
Farm House (Bastrop, Texas), listed on the National Register of Historic Places in Bastrop County, Texas

See also
 Farm House (film), a 2008 horror film
Farmhouse (disambiguation)
Farmer House (disambiguation)